Cherimoya (4 May 1908 – 1927) was a Thoroughbred racehorse that won the 1911 Epsom Oaks in the only start of her racing career. Her most notable offspring were the fillies Sunny Moya and Una Cameron. Cherimoya was euthanised in 1927.

Background
Cherimoya was bred by W. Broderick Cloete and was foaled on 4 May 1908 at his Hare Park estate near London. Cloete was a South African mining entrepreneur who had campaigned the 1885 2000 Guineas winner Paradox. Cherimoya's sire, Cherry Tree, was bred by Cloete and was sold as a yearling in 1892 to American turfman Marcus Daly for 4,000 guineas; Daly relocated him to his Bitterroot Stud in the Bitterroot Valley of Montana. He was named Matt Byrnes (after a noted horse trainer) in the United States and raced with some success. Cloete repurchased the horse from Daly for $25,000 in October 1897 and renamed him Cherry Tree. Cherimoya's dam, Svelte, was also bred by Cloete and was not a successful racehorse. She was exclusively bred to Cherry Tree whilst owned by Cloete, producing five full-siblings to Cherimoya.

Cherimoya was a described by The Sydney Morning Herald as a "fine, substantial, big boned filly."

Racing career
Racing for Broderick Cloete, Cherimoya won The Oaks in the only official start of her racing career. Cloete's racing colours were a crimson shirt with black and white sleeves and a black cap. Cherimoya was trained by Charles Marsh at Newmarket and was a promising racehorse in her two-year-old trials. A few days before her anticipated first start at Sandown in the National Breeders' Produce Stakes, Cherimoya cut one of her fetlock joints after an exercise session when she was startled by a bird and fell over "a heap of stones" used for mending a nearby road. The injury prevented Cherimoya from competing the rest of the season and she was sidelined until her start in the Oaks.

1911 Epsom Oaks

On 2 June, Cherimoya started in the Oaks Stakes in a field of 21 horses. Cherimoya held a good position from the start of the race, taking the lead a quarter of a mile from the finish and winning easily by three lengths over the betting favourite Tootles. Cherimoya was an unanticipated winner, factoring at 20 to 1 odds in the betting pools, and her win reportedly left "the spectators too dumbfounded to cheer." She was ridden by a 16-year-old apprentice jockey named Fred Winter, later a successful horse trainer and the father of champion jockey and trainer Fred Winter.

Cherimoya was entered in the St. James Stakes at Kempton Park held in August, but did not run in the race. The Times speculated that her absence was "in consequence of the hard ground" at the racecourse. The filly was withdrawn from further racing engagements in October 1911 due to trouble from "contracted feet." Cherimoya returned to training as a four-year-old, but injury again prevented her from running in the Coronation Stakes and Cesarewich Stakes. Cherimoya never raced again and was retired to Cloete's stud at Hare Park in 1913.

Stud career
Cherimoya was retired in 1913 to Broderick Cloete's stud at Hare Park. After the death of Cloete, Cherimoya was sold for $11,500 in 1915 to Sir Thomas Dewar. The proprietors of the Wickliffe Stud, American turfmen James C. Corrigan and Price McKinney, were interested in purchasing Cherimoya but their bid via cablegram for the mare was delayed. By 1918, Cherimoya had been relocated to J.B. Joel's Childwickbury Stud in St. Albans, Hertfordshire. Cherimoya was euthanised in October 1927.

Cherimoya's most notable offspring were the fillies Sunny Moya (foaled in 1917 by Sunstar) and Una Cameron (foaled in 1922 by Gainsborough). Sunny Moya was a dam of the colts The Mac Nab and Sunny Trace. Una Cameron was the dam of the Epsom Derby winner Cameronian.

Pedigree

References

1908 racehorse births
1927 racehorse deaths
Racehorses bred in the United Kingdom
Racehorses trained in the United Kingdom
Thoroughbred family 1-t
Epsom Oaks winners